Pribaykalsky District (Baigal Shadar aimag) is an administrative and municipal district (raion), one of the twenty-one in the Republic of Buryatia, Russia. It is located in the center of the republic. Its administrative center is the rural locality (a selo) of Turuntayevo. As of the 2010 Census, the total population of the district was 26,856, with the population of Turuntayevo accounting for 22.0% of that number.

Geography
The district is mountainous and limited by the Morskoy, Khamar-Daban, Ulan-Burgas and Golondin ranges. It is bound on the northeast by the shores of Lake Baikal and by the left bank of the Selenga River in the southwestern part. The Turka and Itantsa are other important rivers of the area.

History
The district was established on December 12, 1940 from parts of the territories of Kabansky and Barguzinsky Districts.

Administrative and municipal status
Within the framework of administrative divisions, Pribaykalsky District is one of the twenty-one in the Republic of Buryatia. The district is divided into nine selsoviets, which comprise thirty-eight rural localities. As a municipal division, the district is incorporated as Pribaykalsky Municipal District. Its nine selsoviets are incorporated as ten rural settlements within the municipal district. The selo of Turuntayevo serves as the administrative center of both the administrative and municipal district.

References

Notes

Sources

Districts of Buryatia
States and territories established in 1940